Angelo Scalzone (2 January 1931 – 29 April 1987) was an Italian sport shooter who won a gold medal in trap shooting at the 1972 Summer Olympics. He died of liver cancer in France, aged 56.

Also his son Roberto (1962-2019) was a sport shooter.

References

External links

 
 

1931 births
1987 deaths
Sportspeople from Naples
Italian male sport shooters
Trap and double trap shooters
Olympic shooters of Italy
Olympic gold medalists for Italy
Shooters at the 1972 Summer Olympics
Olympic medalists in shooting
Medalists at the 1972 Summer Olympics
20th-century Italian people